Amalio Reyes, A Man (Amalio Reyes, un hombre) is a 1970  Argentine drama film directed by Enrique Carreras and written by Norberto Aroldi. It was based on the story by Cátulo Castillo. The film starred Elsa Daniel, Hugo del Carril and Mario Lozano.

Cast
 Juan Alighieri
 Alejandro Anderson
 Guillermo Battaglia
 Pedro Buchardo
 Elsa Daniel
 Hugo del Carril
 Beto Gianola
 Juan Carlos Lamas
 Mario Lozano
 Ubaldo Martínez
 Luis Medina Castro
 Nathán Pinzón
 Jorge Salcedo
 Julia Sandoval
 Miguel Angel Ferreiro

References

External links
 

1970 films
1970s Spanish-language films
1970 comedy films
Argentine comedy films
1970s Argentine films
Films directed by Enrique Carreras